Phacelia mustelina is an uncommon species of phacelia known by the common names weasel phacelia and Death Valley round-leaved phacelia. It is native to the desert mountains and flats of eastern California (mainly Death Valley and Inyo County) and western Nevada (Nye County), where it grows in woodland and open scrub habitat.

The hairy, glandular inflorescence is a one-sided curving or coiling cyme of bell-shaped flowers. Each flower is up to a centimeter long and deep to light purple to nearly white in color.

External links
Jepson Manual Treatment
Nevada Natural Heritage Program Rare Plant Fact Sheet
Photo gallery

mustelina
Flora of the California desert regions
Flora of Nevada
Death Valley
Flora without expected TNC conservation status